Federal Highway 199 (Carretera Federal 199) is a Federal Highway of Mexico located in Chiapas, connecting Mexican Federal Highway 190 at Rancho Nuevo to Catazajá.

References

199